George Laurenson (5 July 1857 – 19 November 1913) was a New Zealand Member of Parliament for  in the South Island.

Early life
The Lyttelton Times parliamentary correspondent described Laurenson as: "a Scotchman by birth, a Shetlander by education, a New Zealander by adoption, a storekeeper by trade, and a yachtsman by preference."

George Laurenson was a partner in Forbes and Co, Ships Chandlers, of Lyttelton. He was born in Edinburgh, Scotland, and was educated in the Shetland Islands. Laurenson served on numerous local boards and committees: he was chairman of the Lyttelton Harbour Board and the Canterbury Chamber of Commerce. Laurenson was a member of the Navy League Canterbury.

Member of Parliament

Laurenson represented the Lyttelton electorate in the New Zealand House of Representatives for fourteen years from 1899 to his death in 1913. From 1909 until 1910 he was senior whip of the Liberal Party.

New Liberal Party
Laurenson was the nominal leader or chairman of the New Liberal Party in 1905 though Tommy Taylor was the dominant figure. Like Taylor, Laurenson favoured federation with Australia. Laurenson was one of the few who stood as a New Liberal in the  election and retained his seat. Most, including Taylor were defeated.

Cabinet Minister
On 22 March 1912 he stood in a leadership election against Thomas Mackenzie to decide the successor to Sir Joseph Ward as leader of the Liberal Party, but lost (9 votes to 22). He was subsequently the Deputy Prime Minister and Minister of Labour, Customs and Marine in Mackenzie's cabinet. In July the Liberal government was defeated, after the defection of some Liberal members like John A. Millar to Reform.

Local politics
In April 1913, Laurenson stood for mayor of Lyttelton, contesting the election with John Richard Webb, a Lyttelton borough councillor. Webb won; he received 608 votes to Laurenson's 490.

Later life
Laurenson was a Labour movement sympathizer, but never formally joined the Labour Party though he agreed with the Labour Party's stand during the 1913 general strike, and was often known to have appeared at meetings with the leaders of the Federation of Labour (the 'Red Feds'). Laurenson died on 19 November 1913 aged just 56. Laurenson's seat was won by a Labour candidate, James McCombs.

A son of George Laurenson, George Lyttelton Laurenson CBE (1893–1968), was Commissioner of Transport.

Notes

References

|-

1857 births
1913 deaths
New Zealand Liberal Party MPs
Independent MPs of New Zealand
Members of the Cabinet of New Zealand
Local politicians in New Zealand
New Zealand businesspeople
New Zealand people of Scottish descent
Politicians from Edinburgh
People from Shetland
New Liberal Party (New Zealand) MPs
Members of the New Zealand House of Representatives
New Zealand MPs for Christchurch electorates
19th-century New Zealand politicians
Lyttelton Harbour Board members